Christian Gerald Van Cuyk (January 3, 1927 – November 3, 1992) was a Major League Baseball left-handed pitcher. His older brother, Johnny Van Cuyk, also pitched in the majors.

Signed by the Brooklyn Dodgers as an amateur free agent in 1946, Van Cuyk made his Major League Baseball debut with the Brooklyn Dodgers on July 16, 1950, and appeared in his final game on August 15, 1952.

Prior to his entrance into professional baseball, Van Cuyk served in the US Navy during World War II.

References

External links

1927 births
1992 deaths
Brooklyn Dodgers players
Cambridge Dodgers players
Fort Worth Cats players
Montreal Royals players
Vancouver Mounties players
Oakland Oaks (baseball) players
Chattanooga Lookouts players
St. Paul Saints (AA) players
Tampa Tarpons (1957–1987) players
Major League Baseball pitchers
People from Kimberly, Wisconsin
Baseball players from Wisconsin
United States Navy personnel of World War II